The Seasider is a tourist train in the South Island of New Zealand, operated by the Dunedin Railways along the Main South Line between the historic Dunedin Railway Station and Palmerston once or twice a week in the summer months and occasionally during winter.  Since the demise of the Southerner in February 2002 it has been the only regular passenger train on this stretch of line.

Further reading

External links 
 Dunedin Railways - the Seasider

Long-distance passenger trains in New Zealand
Rail transport in Otago